The men's 5000 metres speed skating competition of the 2018 Winter Olympics was held at Gangneung Oval in Gangneung on 11 February 2018.

Summary
The event was won by two-time defending champion Sven Kramer in an Olympic record time of 6:09:76. In doing so, he became the first man to win three gold medals in a speed skating event in three consecutive editions of the Olympics. Ted-Jan Bloemen won the silver medal, and Sverre Lunde Pedersen won the bronze medal. Bloemen and Pedersen skated in the same pair, posted the same time, and were separated by the photo finish data. Both won their first Olympic medal.

The field also included 2014 silver medalist Jan Blokhuijsen and 2010 silver medalist Lee Seung-hoon. In the 5th pair, Lee, skating against Bart Swings, posted the best time, with Swings being tentatively second. In the 8th pair, Blokhuijsen took on Peter Michael. Though trailing for most of the distance, Michael came out on top, posting the then-fastest time 0.08 seconds ahead of Lee. Blokhuijsen failed to maintain his initial pace and came home fourth. In the 9th pair, Bloemen and Pedersen crossed the finish line simultaneously, propelling them into the lead. The finish photo showed an 0.002 advantage for Bloemen, setting Pedersen back to second. In the 10th pair, Sven Kramer set a new Olympic record of 6:09:76, becoming Olympic champion in the process as the final pair of Nicola Tumolero and Moritz Geisreiter failed to challenge.

In the victory ceremony, the medals were presented by Pierre-Olivier Beckers-Vieujant, member of the International Olympic Committee accompanied by Jan Dijkema, ISU president.

Records
Prior to this competition, the existing world and Olympic records were as follows.

The following record was set during this competition.

OR = Olympic record

Results
The races were started at 16:00.

OR = Olympic record, TR = track record

References

Men's speed skating at the 2018 Winter Olympics